Vardø is a town and the administrative centre of Vardø Municipality in Troms og Finnmark county, Norway. The town is located on the island of Vardøya in the Barents Sea, just off the coast of the large Varanger Peninsula.

Vardø is the easternmost town in Norway (and in all the Nordic countries), located at 31°E, which is east of Saint Petersburg, Kyiv, and Istanbul. The eastern part of Finnmark is in the same time zone as the rest of the country, but it is more than an hour at odds with daylight hours.

The largest industry in the town is fishing and fish processing.  There is a good port in Vardø, and another port in nearby Svartnes, on the mainland.  The town is connected to the mainland by the undersea Vardø Tunnel which is part of European route E75.  Vardø Airport, Svartnes is located at the other end of the tunnel on the mainland.

History

The village of Vardø, on the island of Vardøya, was made important because of the Vardøhus Fortress that was built on the island in the early 14th century.  The village grew up around the fortress and became a major trading post between the Norwegians in Finnmark county and the nearby Russians.  In the 17th century, Vardø was a centre of several high-profile witch trials, most notably the 1621 witch trial and 1662 witch trials.

Pomor trade was very important in the 18th century, and Vardø was often called the Pomor capital.  Because of this, in 1789 the King of Norway granted Vardø town status as a kjøpstad.

On 1 January 1838, the town and the surrounding rural district were established as the new municipality of Vardø by og landdistrikt, meaning "Vardø town and rural district" (see Formannskapsdistrikt).  This arrangement did not entirely satisfy the new formannskapsdistrikt law, so in 1839, the town was separated from the rural district to form its own town-municipality.  Since the Vardø landdistrikt outside the town had too few residents (according to the law), one municipal government was shared between the two until 22 May 1868 when a royal resolution was passed making them completely separate and self-governing.  On 1 January 1874, a small area of Vardø landdistrikt (population: 48) was transferred to the town of Vardø.  On 1 January 1964, the eastern part of Båtsfjord (population: 621) was merged with the town of Vardø, forming the new (present-day) Vardø Municipality.

Name

The town is named after the island on which it is located: Vardøya.  The Old Norse form of the name was Vargøy. The first element is vargr which means "wolf" and the last element is øy which means "island".  The first element was later replaced (around 1500) with varða which means "cairn".

Climate 
The port of Vardø, on the Barents Sea, remains ice-free all year round thanks to the warm North Atlantic drift. Vardø has a tundra climate (Köppen: ET), that borders on a subarctic climate (Köppen: Dfc). Excluding high mountain areas, it is the only town in Norway proper that has a polar climate. As the daily mean temperature of its warmest month does not reach 10 °C (the minimum temperature required for tree growth), the land is tundra and is treeless. The "midnight sun" is above the horizon from 16 May to 29 July, and the period with polar night is slightly shorter from 24 November to 19 January.

Globus Radar
Since 1998, the town has housed a radar installation called Globus II. Its official purpose is the tracking of space junk; however, due to the site's proximity to Russia, and an alleged connection between the Globus II system and US anti-missile systems, the site has been the basis for heated controversy in diplomatic and intelligence circles.

An upgrade to the radar system is under construction on the island. The Russian military considers the radar station a threat to its national security.

See also
List of towns and cities in Norway

References

External links
 vardo.kommune.no page
 Tourist information
 Tourist information

Cities and towns in Norway
1789 establishments in Norway
Port cities and towns in Norway
Vardø
Populated places of Arctic Norway
Millennium sites